John Griffiths (born 1835) was a sailor in the U.S. Navy during the American Civil War. He received the Medal of Honor for his actions during the Second Battle of Fort Fisher on January 15, 1865.

Military service
Emigrating from his native Wales, Griffiths volunteered for service in the Union Army 8 April 1864 as a private in the 20th Massachusetts Infantry. He enlisted from Barnstable. On May 17 1864, Griffiths was transferred to the U.S. Navy as a seaman and was assigned via the receiving ship USS Ohio to the Union brig . His enlistment is credited to the state of Massachusetts.

On January 15, 1865, the North Carolina Confederate stronghold of Fort Fisher was taken by a combined Union storming party of sailors, marines, and soldiers under the command of Admiral David Dixon Porter and General Alfred Terry. Griffiths was a member of the storming party.

Medal of Honor citation
The President of the United States of America, in the name of Congress, takes pleasure in presenting the Medal of Honor to Captain of the Forecastle John Griffiths, United States Navy, for extraordinary heroism in action while serving on board the U.S.S. Santiago de Cuba during the assault on Fort Fisher, North Carolina, on 15 January 1865. As one of a boat crew detailed to one of the generals on shore, Captain of the Forecastle Griffiths bravely entered the fort in the assault and accompanied his party in carrying dispatches at the height of the battle. He was one of six men who entered the fort in the assault from the fleet.

General Orders: War Department, General Orders No. 59 (June 22, 1865)

Action Date: January 15, 1865

Service: Navy

Rank: Captain of the Forecastle

Division: U.S.S. Santiago de Cuba

See also

List of Medal of Honor recipients
List of American Civil War Medal of Honor recipients: A–F
 Massachusetts Soldiers, Sailors, and Marines in the Civil War, Vol VIII, pg 106
 Fold3

References

1835 births
Year of death missing
Union Navy officers
United States Navy Medal of Honor recipients
Welsh-born Medal of Honor recipients
American Civil War recipients of the Medal of Honor
Welsh emigrants to the United States